"C.B. Savage" is a gay-themed novelty country song by the American singer-songwriter Rod Hart, from his album Breakeroo!. It peaked at #67 on the Billboard Hot 100, giving him his only entry on that chart. It was also the first of only three songs with the title "Savage", along with "Savage" by Megan Thee Stallion and Beyonce and "Savage Love" by Jason Derulo and Jawsh 685.

The song is a gay answer to C.W. McCall's hit, "Convoy."

Charts

References

External links
 

1976 singles
1976 songs
Rod Hart songs
Recitation songs
Novelty songs
Songs about truck driving
Songs about transport
Citizens band radio in popular culture
LGBT-related songs